This is a list of the characters who have appeared in the BAFTA-award-winning franchise of CBBC children's drama series The Story of Tracy Beaker, Tracy Beaker Returns, The Dumping Ground, My Mum Tracy Beaker and The Beaker Girls, which have spanned fourteen years between them. Connor Byrne, who plays Mike Milligan, is the franchise's longest serving cast member, having appeared in twelve series across three of four shows. Dani Harmer has played the lead character Tracy Beaker in The Story Of Tracy Beaker, Tracy Beaker Returns, My Mum Tracy Beaker and The Beaker Girls and featured as a guest in the sixth series of The Dumping Ground.

The Story of Tracy Beaker

Tracy Beaker Returns

The Dumping Ground

My Mum Tracy Beaker

The Beaker Girls

See also
List of The Story of Tracy Beaker characters
List of Tracy Beaker Returns characters
List of The Dumping Ground characters

References

Story of Tracy Beaker
 
Characters